Dame Elizabeth Cockayne, DBE (29 October 1894 – 4 July 1988) was Chief Nursing Officer from the inception of the National Health Service in 1948 until her retirement a decade later in 1958. She was succeeded by Dame Kathleen Raven.

Career
Born in Burton-on-Trent, Cockayne decided to become a nurse due to her own experiences with ill health, such as smallpox and scarlatina. She was trained in Plymouth and Sheffield. In 1954 she chaired the World Health Organization's Expert Committee on Nursing.

Awards/honours
She was awarded the Florence Nightingale Medal by the International Council of Nurses. In 1955 she was appointed a Dame Commander of the Order of the British Empire (DBE).

Death
Dame Elizabeth Cockayne died at Rushett Cottage, Littleheath Lane, Cobham, Surrey on 4 July 1988, aged 93.

References

External links

NCBI site

1894 births
1988 deaths
NHS Chief Professional Officers
English nurses
British nursing administrators
Dames Commander of the Order of the British Empire
People from Burton upon Trent
People from Cobham, Surrey
Florence Nightingale Medal recipients